Characteristic equation may refer to:
 Characteristic equation (calculus), used to solve linear differential equations
 Characteristic equation, the equation obtained by equating to zero the characteristic polynomial of a matrix or of a linear mapping
 Method of characteristics, a technique for solving partial differential equations

See also
 Characteristic (disambiguation)